The Hong Kong Autonomy Act is legislation passed by the United States Congress following the enactment in June 2020 by the Chinese Standing Committee of the National People's Congress of the Hong Kong national security law.

The Act was signed into law by US President Donald Trump on 14 July 2020, and imposes sanctions on officials and entities in Hong Kong as well as in mainland China that are deemed to help violate Hong Kong's autonomy, and punishes financial institutions that do business with them.

At the signing, Trump also signed Executive Order 13936 to "hold China accountable for its aggressive actions against the people of Hong Kong". Trump also revoked the territory's special status, saying “No special privileges [for Hong Kong], no special economic treatment and no export of sensitive technologies". He also blocked any dealings in US property by anyone determined to be responsible for or complicit in "actions or policies that undermine democratic processes or institutions in Hong Kong", and directs  officials to "revoke license exceptions for exports to Hong Kong," and includes revoking special treatment for Hong Kong passport holders. Citing the Act, on 11 August 2020, the United States customs announced that after 25 September goods imported into the US cannot use the "Made In Hong Kong" label and will need to be labeled "Made In China".

Passage 

The bill was sponsored by Democratic senator Chris Van Hollen and Republican senator Pat Toomey. It was approved by lawmakers in both houses by unanimous consent.

Chinese response 
The day following the signing, China promised retaliation if the US implemented the Act. The Chinese foreign ministry referred to the law as "a mistake", said that it amounted to "gross interference in China's internal affairs" and that the US was violating international law and basic norms of international relations.

See also 
 Hong Kong Policy Act
 Hong Kong Human Rights and Democracy Act
 Magnitsky Act
 United States sanctions against China

References

External links

Acts of the 116th United States Congress
China–United States relations
Democracy promotion
Hong Kong–United States relations
Human rights legislation
Sanctions legislation
United States foreign relations legislation
Hong Kong national security law
United States sanctions
Sanctions against China